A preamble is an introductory and expressionary statement in a document that explains the document's purpose and underlying philosophy.  When applied to the opening paragraphs of a statute, it may recite historical facts pertinent to the subject of the statute.  It is distinct from the long title or enacting formula of a law.

In parliamentary procedure using Robert's Rules of Order, a preamble consists of "Whereas" clauses that are placed before the resolving clauses in a resolution (formal written motion). However, preambles are not required to be placed in resolutions. According to Robert's Rules of Order, including such background information may not be helpful in passing the resolution.

Legal effect
While preambles may be regarded as unimportant introductory matter, their words may have effects that may not have been foreseen by their drafters.

France

In France, the preamble to the constitution of the Fifth Republic of 1958 was considered ancillary and therefore non-binding until a major jurisprudential reversal by the Constitutional Council in a decision of 16 July 1971. This decision, which began with the words "Having regard to the constitution and its preamble," affected a considerable change of French constitutional law, as the preamble and the texts it referred to, the Declaration of the Rights of Man and of the Citizen of 1789 and the preamble to the constitution of the Fourth Republic, took their place alongside the constitution proper as texts understood as being invested with constitutional value.

Canada
In Canada, the preamble to the Constitution Act, 1867 was cited by the Supreme Court of Canada in the Provincial Judges Reference, to increase guarantees to judicial independence. The Bosnian Constitutional Court, particularly citing the case law of the Supreme Court of Canada, also declared that the provisions of the preamble of the Bosnian Constitution are invested with a normative force thereby serving as a sound standard of judicial review for the Constitutional Court.

European Union
Due to concern over its potential effects, the draft preamble of the proposed European Constitution, in 2002, caused much controversy because of the possible inclusion of a reference to the Christian heritage of Europe.

Australia
Likewise, in Australia in 1999, a referendum on whether to adopt a new preamble was accompanied by a promise that the preamble, if adopted, could not be enforceable by the courts, as some were worried with how the preamble could be interpreted and applied.

India

In India, the Supreme Court frequently rules unconstitutional amendments which violate the Basic Structure of the Constitution, especially its Preamble.

See also
Preamble to the United Nations Charter
Preamble to the United States Constitution
Preamble to the 1987 Constitution of the Philippines
Preamble to the Canadian Charter of Rights and Freedoms
Preamble and Title 1 of the Swiss Federal Constitution
Constitution of Fiji: Preamble
Preamble to the Albanian Constitution
Preamble to the Constitution of India

References

Legal terminology
Legal documents